This is a list of player transfers involving United Rugby Championship rugby union teams between the end of the 2020–21 season and before the start of the 2021–22 season.

Benetton

Players In
 Rhyno Smith from  Cheetahs 
 Carl Wegner from  Cheetahs
 Nahuel Tetaz Chaparro from  Bristol Bears 
 Andries Coetzee from  Hanazono Kintetsu Liners
 Riccardo Favretto from  Mogliano
 Manuel Zuliani from  Mogliano
 Tomás Albornoz from  Jaguares XV
 Lorenzo Cannone from  Petrarca
 Joey Caputo from  Gungahlin Eagles
 Franco Smith from  Colorno
 Leonardo Marin from  Mogliano
 Lorenzo Pani from  I Cavalieri Prato
 Tommy Bell from  Mont-de-Marsan
 Yaree Fantini from  Ayrshire Bulls
 Mattia Bellini from  Zebre Parma

Players Out
 Marco Riccioni to  Saracens
 Jayden Hayward retired
 Tommaso Allan to  Harlequins 
 Charly Trussardi to  Albi
 Nicola Quaglio to  Rovigo Delta
 Paolo Garbisi to  Montpellier
 Leonardo Sarto to  Rovigo Delta
 Angelo Esposito to  Petrarca
 Alberto Sgarbi to  Petrarca
 Derrick Appiah to  Colorno
 Marco Barbini retired 
 Marco Zanon to  Pau
 Lorenzo Pani to  Zebre Parma

Bulls

Players In
 Jacques du Plessis from  Montpellier
 Johan Goosen from  Montpellier
 Ruan Combrinck unattached
 Lionel Mapoe from  Nice
 Bismarck du Plessis from  Montpellier
 David Coetzer from  Blue Bulls
 FC du Plessis from  Blue Bulls
 Kabelo Mokoena from  Blue Bulls
 Sibongile Novuka from  Blue Bulls
 Uzile Tele from  Blue Bulls
 Cyle Brink from  Leicester Tigers
 Dylan Smith from  Ealing Trailfinders
 Ruan Vermaak from  NTT DoCoMo Red Hurricanes Osaka

Players Out
 Ivan van Zyl to  Saracens 
 Marco van Staden to  Leicester Tigers 
 Jan Uys to  Grenoble
 Tim Agaba to  Carcassonne
 Marnus Potgieter to  Sharks
 Nizaam Carr to  Wasps
 Travis Ismaiel retired
 Clinton Swart to  Shizuoka Blue Revs
 Dawid Kellerman to  Mie Honda Heat
 Duane Vermeulen to  Ulster
 Diego Appollis to  Blue Bulls U21
 Henco Beukes to  Griquas
 Jandre Burger to  Blue Bulls
 Werner Gouws to  Blue Bulls U21
 Jay-Cee Nel to  Griquas
 Raynard Roets to  Blue Bulls
 Janco Uys to  Griquas
 James Verity-Amm to  Griquas
 Trevor Nyakane to  Racing 92
 David Coetzer to  Houston SaberCats

Cardiff

Players In
 Immanuel Feyi-Waboso promoted from Academy 
 Rhys Priestland from  Bath
 Matthew Screech from  Dragons

Players Out
 Ben Warren to  Ospreys
 Ioan Rhys Davies to  Graulhet
 Ioan Davies to  Dragons
 Ethan Lewis to  Saracens
 Lewis Jones to  Dragons (short-term loan)
 Cory Hill to  Yokohama Canon Eagles
 Brad Thyer to  Glasgow Warriors (short-term loan)
 Ben Murphy to  Doncaster Knights
 Alun Lawrence to  Jersey Reds (season-long loan)
 Olly Robinson to  Leicester Tigers (season-long loan)
 Sam Moore to  Ospreys

Connacht

Players In
 Oran McNulty promoted from Academy
 Cian Prendergast promoted from Academy
 Alex Wootton from  Munster
 Mack Hansen from  Brumbies 
 Dylan Tierney-Martin promoted from Academy
 Leva Fifita from  Grenoble
 Shayne Bolton from  Shimlas
 Greg McGrath from  Leinster
 Sam Illo from  Leinster
 Tietie Tuimauga from  Manawatu

Players Out
 Quinn Roux to  Toulon 
 Stephen Fitzgerald retired
 Seán O'Brien to  Exeter Chiefs
 Stephen Kerins to  Ealing Trailfinders
 Conor Dean released
 Colm de Buitléar released
 Paddy McAllister retired
 Cillian Gallagher retired
 Conor Kenny to  Newcastle Falcons 
 Seán O'Brien retired

Dragons

Players in
 Will Rowlands from  Wasps
 Evan Lloyd promoted from Academy
 Mesake Doge from  Brive
 Aki Seiuli from  Glasgow Warriors
 Ioan Davies from  Cardiff
 Taylor Davies from  Scarlets (season-long loan)
 Lewis Jones from  Cardiff (short-term loan)
 Jordan Olowofela from  Leicester Tigers (season-long loan)
 Cory Allen from  Ospreys

Players out
 Lewis Evans retired
 Matthew Screech to  Cardiff
 Arwel Robson to  Cornish Pirates
 Connor Edwards to  Doncaster Knights
 Ed Scragg to  Cornish Pirates
 Carwyn Penny to  Cornish Pirates
 Luke Baldwin returned to  Worcester Warriors
 Dafydd Howells to  Ebbw Vale
 Ryan Bevington retired
 Tom Griffiths to  Coventry (season-long loan)
 Deon Smith to  Newport
 Storm Hanekom to  Nottingham
 Rhys Lawrence to  Carmarthen Quins
 Max Ayling to  Jersey Reds
 Joe Goodchild to  Ampthill
 Brok Harris to  Stormers
 James Benjamin to  Cornish Pirates (short-term loan)
 Luke Yendle to  Jersey Reds (short-term loan)
 Aaron Jarvis retired
 Ioan Davies to  Jersey Reds (short-term loan)
 Richard Hibbard retired
 Jamie Roberts to  NSW Waratahs
 Dan Babos to  Coventry (short-term loan)
 Tavis Knoyle released

Edinburgh

Players In
 James Lang from  Harlequins 
 Glen Young from  Harlequins
 Ben Vellacott from  Wasps
 Luan de Bruin from  Leicester Tigers
 Adam McBurney from  Ulster
 Pierce Phillips from  Agen
 Henry Immelman from  Montpellier
 Cameron Hutchison from  Heriot's
 Nathan Chamberlain promoted from Academy
 Ben Muncaster promoted from Academy
 Emiliano Boffelli from  Racing 92 
 Ramiro Moyano from  Toulon
 Harry Lloyd from  Western Force (short-term deal)

Players Out
 Duhan van der Merwe to  Worcester Warriors 
 Andrew Davidson to  Gloucester 
 Simon Berghan to  Glasgow Warriors
 Ally Miller to  Glasgow Warriors
 Mike Willemse to  London Irish
 Eroni Sau to  Provence
 Lewis Carmichael retired
 Rory Sutherland to  Worcester Warriors
 Kyle Rowe to  London Irish
 Andries Ferreira to  Carcassonne
 Murray McCallum to  Glasgow Warriors
 Charlie Jupp released
 Scott King released
 Shaun Gunn to  Southern Knights
 Jack Mann to  Heriot's
 Dan Nutton to  London Scottish
 Patrick Harrison to  Wasps (short-term loan)
 Jamie Farndale to  Scotland Sevens
 Jordan Venter to  Bath
 George Taylor retired

Glasgow Warriors

Players In
 Duncan Weir from  Worcester Warriors 
 Jamie Bhatti from  Bath
 Ross Thompson promoted from Academy
 Simon Berghan from  Edinburgh
 Lewis Bean from  Northampton Saints 
 Jack Dempsey from  NSW Waratahs 
 Josh McKay from  Crusaders
 Ollie Smith promoted from Academy
 Sione Tuipulotu from  Shizuoka Blue Revs
 Ally Miller from  Edinburgh
 Domingo Miotti from  Western Force
 Sebastián Cancelliere from  Jaguares XV
 Tom Lambert promoted from Academy
 Murray McCallum from  Edinburgh (short-term deal)
 Brad Thyer from  Cardiff (short-term loan)
 Walter Fifita from  North Harbour
 Nathan McBeth from  Lions
 Tom Jordan from  Ayrshire Bulls
 Ewan Ashman from  Sale Sharks (season-long loan)

Players Out
 Adam Hastings to  Gloucester 
 Chris Fusaro retired
 Fotu Lokotui to  Agen 
 D'Arcy Rae to  Bath
 Dylan Evans returned to  Scarlets
 TJ Ioane returned to  London Irish
 Ian Keatley released
 George Thornton to  Ayrshire Bulls
 Robbie Nairn to  Ayrshire Bulls
 Leone Nakarawa to  Toulon 
 Huw Jones to  Harlequins
 Alex Allan to  Hong Kong Scottish
 Aki Seiuli to  Dragons
 Connor de Bruyn released
 Bruce Flockhart retired
 Nikola Matawalu to  Montauban
 Mesu Dolokoto to  Fijian Drua
 Murray McCallum to  Worcester Warriors
 Lee Jones to  Scotland Sevens
 Paddy Kelly to  Scotland Sevens
 Ollie Melville to  Jamaica Sevens
 Peter Horne retired
 Nick Grigg to  NTT DoCoMo Red Hurricanes Osaka

Leinster

Players In
 Nick McCarthy from  Munster
 Michael Ala'alatoa from  Crusaders
 Tom Clarkson promoted from Academy
 David Hawkshaw promoted from Academy
 Michael Milne promoted from Academy

Players Out
 Rowan Osborne to  Munster
 Scott Fardy retired
 Cian Kelleher to  Ealing Trailfinders 
 Greg McGrath to  Connacht
 Hugh O'Sullivan to  London Irish
 Michael Bent to  Taranaki
 Paddy Patterson to  Munster
 Sam Illo to  Connacht
 Dan Leavy retired

Lions

Players In
 Edwill van der Merwe from  Stormers
 Eddie Fouché from  Pumas
 Pieter Jansen van Vuren from  Pumas
 Matt More from  Pumas
 Morgan Naudé from  Pumas
 Christopher Hollis from  Griquas
 Ginter Smuts from  Pumas
 Travis Gordon from  Golden Lions
 Lunga Ncube from  Golden Lions
 PJ Steenkamp from  Golden Lions
 Henco van Wyk from  Golden Lions
 JP Smith from  LA Giltinis
 Sanele Nohamba from  Sharks

Players Out
 Marnus Schoeman to  Grenoble
 Jan-Henning Campher to  Ealing Trailfinders
 Len Massyn to  Ealing Trailfinders
 Hacjivah Dayimani to  Stormers
 Gianni Lombard to  NTT DoCoMo Red Hurricanes Osaka
 Courtnall Skosan to  Northampton Saints
 Aidynn Cupido to  Golden Lions
 Izan Esterhuizen to  Golden Lions
 James Mollentze injured
 Banele Mthenjane to  Golden Lions
 Oupa Mthiyane to  Golden Lions
 Lindo Ncusane to  Golden Lions
 Luke Rossouw to  Golden Lions
 Ngia Selengbe to  Golden Lions
 Sibusiso Shongwe to  Golden Lions
 Roelof Smit to  Golden Lions
 Boitumelo Tsatsane to  Golden Lions
 Dameon Venter to  Golden Lions
 Dan Kriel to  Seattle Seawolves
 Dillon Smit to  Houston SaberCats
 Nathan McBeth to  Glasgow Warriors
 Wilhelm van der Sluys retired
 Ross Cronjé retired

Munster

Players In
 Jake Flannery promoted from Academy
 James French promoted from Academy
 Seán French promoted from Academy
 Ben Healy promoted from Academy
 John Hodnett promoted from Academy
 Rowan Osborne from  Leinster
 Thomas Ahern promoted from Academy
 Jack Crowley promoted from Academy
 Jack Daly promoted from Academy
 Jason Jenkins from  Toyota Verblitz
 Josh Wycherley promoted from Academy
 Simon Zebo from  Racing 92
 Paddy Patterson from  Leinster
 Declan Moore from  Sydney University

Players Out
 Nick McCarthy to  Leinster
 Billy Holland retired
 Alex Wootton to  Connacht
 CJ Stander retired
 JJ Hanrahan to  Clermont 
 Tommy O'Donnell retired
 James Cronin to  Biarritz
 Rhys Marshall to  North Harbour
 Alex McHenry to  Wasps (short-term loan)
 Declan Moore to  Ulster (short-term loan)

Ospreys

Players In
 Tomas Francis from  Exeter Chiefs 
 Jac Morgan from  Scarlets
 Ben Warren from  Cardiff
 Osian Knott from  Scarlets
 Michael Collins from  Highlanders
 Jack Regan from  Highlanders
 Elvis Taione from  Exeter Chiefs
 Alex Cuthbert from  Exeter Chiefs
 Scott Baldwin from  Worcester Warriors
 Sam Moore from  Cardiff

Players Out
 Guido Volpi to  Doncaster Knights
 Rhys Davies released
 Garyn Lloyd released
 Luke Price to  Valence Romans
 Scott Williams to  Scarlets
 Shaun Venter to  Bayonne
 Caine Woolerton to  Bridgend 
 Jordan Lay to  Auckland
 Rhys Thomas to  Coventry
 Gareth Evans to  Leicester Tigers
 Jordan Walters to  Aberavon
 Nicky Thomas to  Aberavon
 Ben Cambriani to  Ampthill
 Bradley Roderick to  Pontypridd
 Cory Allen to  Dragons
 Lloyd Ashley to  Scarlets (short-term loan)
 Olly Cracknell to  London Irish
 Ifan Phillips retired
 Garyn Phillips to  Cornish Pirates (short-term loan)
 Harri Morgan to  Ampthill (short-term loan)
 Ma'afu Fia to  Bath (short-term loan)

Scarlets

Players In
 WillGriff John from  Sale Sharks
 Carwyn Tuipulotu promoted from Academy 
 Morgan Jones promoted from Academy
 Tomás Lezana from  Western Force
 Dom Booth promoted from Academy
 Kemsley Mathias promoted from Academy
 Iestyn Rees promoted from Academy
 Scott Williams from  Ospreys
 Tom Price from  Exeter Chiefs
 Corey Baldwin from  Exeter Chiefs
 Lloyd Ashley from  Ospreys (short-term loan)

Players Out
 Werner Kruger retired 
 Jac Morgan to  Ospreys
 Uzair Cassiem to  Bayonne 
 Osian Knott to  Ospreys
 Harri Doel to  Worcester Warriors
 Paul Asquith released
 Dylan Evans released
 Pieter Scholtz to  Wasps
 Taylor Davies to  Dragons (season-long loan)
 Will Homer to  Richmond 
 Tom Phillips to  Llandovery
 Danny Drake to  Doncaster Knights
 Jake Ball to  Green Rockets Tokatsu
 Ed Kennedy to  Brumbies
 Joseph Miles to  Pontypridd
 Tom Prydie to  Bath
 James Davies retired

Sharks

Players In
 Marnus Potgieter from  Bulls
 Bongi Mbonambi from  Stormers
 Gerbrandt Grobler from  Stade Français
 Eduan Keyter from  Griquas
 Ben Tapuai from  Harlequins
 Joaquín Díaz Bonilla from  Leicester Tigers
 Olajuwon Noah from  NHRU Wildfires
 Tian Meyer from  Free State Cheetahs (short-term loan)
 Ruan Pienaar from  Free State Cheetahs (short-term loan)
 Lourens Adriaanse from  Sharks (Currie Cup)
 Tinotenda Mavesere from  University of the Western Cape
 Cameron Wright from  Sharks (Currie Cup)
 Dian Bleuler from  Stormers

Players Out
 John-Hubert Meyer to  Béziers
 JJ van der Mescht to  Stade Français
 Michael Kumbirai to  Soyaux Angoulême
 Manie Libbok to  Stormers
 Jordan Chait to  Tel Aviv Heat (short-term loan)
 Caleb Dingaan to  Sharks (Currie Cup)
 Mzamo Majola to  Seattle Seawolves
 Sanele Nohamba to  Lions

Stormers

Players In
 Juan de Jongh from  Wasps
 Deon Fourie from  Grenoble
 Hacjivah Dayimani from  Lions
 Junior Pokomela from  Free State Cheetahs
 Stefan Ungerer from  Griquas
 Brok Harris from  Dragons (short-term deal)
 Manie Libbok from  Sharks
 Justin Basson from  Western Province
 Dian Bleuler from  Western Province
 JJ Kotze from  Western Province

Players Out
 Juarno Augustus to  Northampton Saints
 Bongi Mbonambi to  Sharks
 Abner van Reenen to  Rovigo Delta
 Edwill van der Merwe to  Lions
 JD Schickerling to  Kobelco Kobe Steelers
 Pieter-Steph du Toit to  Toyota Verblitz
 Ben-Jason Dixon injured
 Michal Haznar to  Griquas
 Sihle Njezula to  Western Province
 Dian Bleuler to  Sharks
 Justin Basson to  Rugby ATL
 David Meihuizen retired

Ulster

Players In
 Aaron Sexton promoted from Academy
 Nathan Doak promoted from Academy
 Tom Stewart promoted from Academy
 Ethan McIlroy promoted from Academy
 Callum Reid promoted from Academy
 David McCann promoted from Academy
 Cormac Izuchukwu promoted from Academy
 Mick Kearney from  Zebre Parma (short-term deal)
 Duane Vermeulen from  Bulls
 Declan Moore from  Munster (short-term loan)
 Ben Moxham promoted from Academy

Players Out
 Hayden Hyde to  Harlequins
 Adam McBurney to  Edinburgh
 Alby Mathewson released
 Kyle McCall released 
 Matt Faddes to  Otago
 Bill Johnston to  Ealing Trailfinders

Zebre Parma

Players In
 Jacopo Trulla from  Calvisano
 Gabriele Venditti from  Calvisano
 Andrea Zambonin from  Calvisano
 Luca Andreani from  Bassa Bresciana Rugby
 Ion Neculai from  I Cavalieri Prato
 Alessandro Fusco from  Fiamme Oro
 Cristian Stoian from  Fiamme Oro
 Asaeli Tuivuaka from  Fiji Sevens
 Tim O'Malley from  Highlanders
 Liam Mitchell from  Hurricanes
 Erich Cronjé from  Pumas
 Ramiro Valdés Iribarren from  La Tablada
 Taina Fox-Matamua from  Tasman
 Chris Cook from  Northampton Saints
 Lorenzo Pani from  Benetton

Players Out
 Ian Nagle retired
 Charles Alaimalo returned to  Southland 
 Lorenzo Masselli released 
 Alexandru Țăruș to  Rouen
 Josh Renton to  Southland
 Samuele Ortis to  Calvisano
 Mick Kearney to  Ulster
 Jamie Elliott to  Bedford Blues
 Ramiro Valdés Iribarren to  Colorno
 Tommaso Castello retired
 Paolo Pescetto to  Colorno
 Giosuè Zilocchi to  London Irish
 Mattia Bellini to  Benetton

See also
List of 2021–22 Premiership Rugby transfers
List of 2021–22 RFU Championship transfers
List of 2021–22 Super Rugby transfers
List of 2021–22 Top 14 transfers
List of 2021–22 Rugby Pro D2 transfers
List of 2021–22 Major League Rugby transfers

References

2021–22 United Rugby Championship
2021-22